František Čermák and Lukáš Rosol were the defending champions, but Čermák chose not to participate this year. Rosol played alongside Rameez Junaid, but they lost in the semifinals to Máximo González and André Sá.
González and Sá went on to win the title, defeating Mariusz Fyrstenberg and Santiago González in the final, 4–6, 6–3, [10–5].

Seeds

Draw

Draw

References
 Main Draw

Croatia Open Umag - Doubles
2015 Doubles